Taping the Radio is the third and final studio album by New Zealand punk rock band Steriogram, released on September 21, 2010 by Bedroom Empire.

Track listing
 "Shamoe" – 03:38
 "Skinny Runt Revolution" – 02:32
 "Taping The Radio" – 03:43
 "Ready For Action" – 02:31
 "Kevvo" – 02:12
 "No Ordinary Man" – 03:29
 "Moving On" – 02:58
 "White Trash" – 03:28*
 "Whiskey" – 02:47
 "Texas Beauties" – 02:27
 "Two Day Hangover" – 02:46
*Appears on Schmack!

Personnel
 Tyson Kennedy - lead vocals
 Tim Youngson - rhythm guitar and backing vocals
 Brad Carter - co-lead vocals and lead guitar
 Jared Wrennall - drum kit and backing vocals
 Jake Adams - bass guitar and backing vocals

References
 http://steriogram.bandcamp.com/

Steriogram albums
2010 albums